Akhorak (also Romanized as Ākhorak; also known as Ākhūrak) is a village in Sarduiyeh Rural District, Sarduiyeh District, Jiroft County, Kerman Province, Iran. At the 2006 census, its population was 131, in 34 families.

References 

Populated places in Jiroft County
Rural Districts of Kerman Province